3614 Jackson Highway is the sixth album by American singer-actress Cher, released on June 20, 1969 by ATCO. This album was a commercial failure, peaking at 160, although it received praise and positive reviews from the music critics. 3614 Jackson Highway was the address of Muscle Shoals Sound Studios. The album is by and large a covers album.

Album information 
3614 Jackson Highway was released in the summer of 1969. It remains Cher's first and last solo studio album for Atco, and was produced by Jerry Wexler, Tom Dowd and Arif Mardin. The cover is a photograph of Cher with the Muscle Shoals Rhythm Section musicians featured on the album. They are: front row, left to right: guitarist Eddie Hinton, bassist David Hood, Sonny Bono, Cher, producer Jerry Wexler, background vocalist Jeannie Greene, background vocalist Donna Jean Godchaux, and producer Tom Dowd. Back row, left to right: lead guitarist Jimmy Johnson, producer Arif Mardin, drummer Roger Hawkins and keyboardist Barry Beckett.  Missing were background vocalists Mary Holiday and Sue Pilkington.

The ambitious record was conceived as a way to bring success to Cher, as well as her group Sonny & Cher, after a two-year period of commercial failure. The constant evolution of pop culture left the formulaic nature of Sonny & Cher's musical endeavors obsolete; pop music had continued to transform into a more political style marked by anti-war songs protesting the conflict in Vietnam. For months the duo maintained a nightclub act, but audience response was less than positive.

Although the album was largely ignored by the public, critical reception was enthusiastic. Cher's maturing vocals, along with the sophisticated instrumentation and arrangements, garnered praise.

The title refers to the address of Muscle Shoals Sound Studio in Sheffield, Alabama, where the album was recorded.

In 1968 and 1969 Cher recorded songs for an album with a tentative release in 1970. For unknown reasons the album was cancelled and five of the tracks were released as singles. The remaining five remained unreleased until 2001 when Rhino Records released a limited edition of 3614 Jackson Highway with the unreleased songs as bonus tracks.

Track listing

Personnel
Cher – lead vocals
Jimmy Johnson – rhythm guitar
Eddie Hinton – lead guitar
Barry Beckett – keyboards
David Hood – bass guitar
Roger Hawkins – drums
Jeanie Greene, Donna Jean Godchaux (née Thatcher), Mary Holladay, Sue Pilkington – backing vocalists

Production
Jerry Wexler – record producer
Tom Dowd – record producer
Arif Mardin – record producer
Stan Vincent – record producer
Greg Poree – arrangement assistance

Design
Stephen Paley – photography
Bryan Lasley – art direction
Patrick Pending – art direction

Charts

References

External links
 Official ATCO Cher page with all info about the album (Archived 2009-10-22)

1969 albums
Cher albums
Albums produced by Tom Dowd
Albums produced by Arif Mardin
Albums produced by Jerry Wexler
Albums recorded at Muscle Shoals Sound Studio
Atco Records albums
Rhino Entertainment albums